The Circuit Bremgarten was a  motorsport race track in Bern, Switzerland which formerly hosted the Swiss Grand Prix from 1933 to 1954 (Formula One, 1947 to 1954) and the Swiss motorcycle Grand Prix in 1949 and from 1951 until 1954.

Bremgarten was built as a motorcycle racing track in 1931 in the Bremgartenwald (Bremgarten forest) in the north of Bern. The circuit itself had no true straight, instead being a collection of high-speed corners. It hosted its first automobile race in 1934, which claimed the life of driver Hugh Hamilton. In 1948 it claimed the life of Italian racer Achille Varzi. From the outset, Bremgarten's tree-lined roads, often poor light conditions and changes in road surface made for what was acknowledged to be a very dangerous circuit, especially in the wet.

Bremgarten has not hosted an official motorsport event since 1955, when spectator racing sports, with the exception of hillclimbing and rallying, were banned in Switzerland in reaction to the 1955 Le Mans disaster. Although there was a 1982 Swiss Grand Prix, it took place in Dijon, France. On June 6, 2007 an amendment to lift the ban was passed by the lower house of the Swiss parliament, 97 in favour and 77 opposed. The legislation failed to pass the upper house, and was withdrawn in 2009 after being rejected twice.

Motorcycle racing
The Grand Prix of Bern took place at Bremgarten from 1931 to 1937 and also in 1947 and 1948. In August 1931 the Bern (Swiss) Grand Prix took place and the Irish motorcyclist Stanley Woods won the 500cc event on a Norton. He won three more events here; 1932 350cc and 500cc races and 1933 500cc race also on a Norton. Jimmie Guthrie won the 350cc and 500cc races in 1937. 

The Bremgarten Circuit was one of the original rounds of the Grand Prix motorcycle World Championship during the inaugural season of 1949 and from 1951 to 1954. Famous riders who raced here included: , Freddie Frith and Geoff Duke. Italian racer Omobono Tenni was killed at Bremgarten during practice for the 1948 event.

Lap records
The official race lap records at the Circuit Bremgarten are listed as:

Notes

External links
Circuit Bremgarten (1950-1954) on Google Maps (Historic Formula 1 Tracks)

Bremgarten
Formula One circuits
Motorsport venues in Switzerland
Grand Prix motorcycle circuits
Swiss Grand Prix